The 1st Brahmans was an infantry regiment of the British Indian Army. It was raised at Oudh by Captain T Naylor in 1776 for service in the army of Nawab Wazir of Oudh, and was known as the Nawab Wazir's Regiment. It was transferred to the East India Company in 1777. In 1922, it was designated as the 4th Battalion 1st Punjab Regiment. The regiment was disbanded in 1931.

Designations
Over the years the regiment was known by a number of different designations:
1776 Nawab Wazir's Brahaman Regiment 
1777 30th Battalion of Bengal Sepoys
1781 23rd Regiment of Bengal Sepoys
1784 29th Regiment of Bengal Sepoys
1786 29th Bengal Sepoy Battalion
1796 2nd Battalion 9th Regiment of Bengal Native Infantry
1824 21st Regiment of Bengal Native Infantry
1861 1st Regiment of Bengal Native Infantry
1885 1st Regiment of Bengal Infantry
1901 1st Brahman Infantry
1903 1st Brahmans
1922 4th Battalion 1st Punjab Regiment

History

East India Company service
While in the service of the East India Company the regiment was awarded battle honours for service in the Second Maratha War 1803-05, the Anglo-Nepalese War 1814-16, the Second Anglo-Burmese War 1824-26 and the Bhurtpore Campaign 1826.

Post First War of Independence 1857 
The regiment was the senior-most among the twelve Bengal Native Infantry regiments that survived the Great Indian Rebellion of 1857-58. It was accordingly one of the small number of Bengal regular infantry regiments to retain the traditions of East India Company service in the new post-Mutiny army. Renumbered as the 1st of the Bengal line, it subsequently saw active service in the Third Anglo-Burmese War of 1885-87. Following the Kitchener reforms of the Indian Army, when the names of the presidencies were dropped, the regiment became the 1st Brahman Infantry in 1901.

World War I
In 1914, the regimental centre of the 1st Brahmans was located at Allahabad and it was linked with the 3rd Brahmans. The regiment was recruited mostly from Agricultural Brahmins Kanyakubj, Saryuparin and Gaur Brahmins(From Today's Haryana,Delhi and West Up),Garhwali Brahmins and Punjabi Brahmins.
Full dress uniform of the sepoys included a high khaki turban with red fringe, a scarlet kurta (long coat) with white facings, white waist-sash, dark blue trousers and white leggings.

The regiment spent part of World War I in India before being posted to Aden, then under threat from Ottoman forces. A second battalion raised in 1917 saw service in the Persian Gulf.

Post-war service and disbandment
After the war, a major reorganization was undertaken in the Indian Army and the various single-battalion infantry regiments were grouped together to form larger regiments of four to six battalions each. The 1st Brahmans became the 4th Battalion of the 1st Punjab Regiment in 1922. It was disbanded in 1931 due to retrenchment in the Indian Army.

See also
1st Punjab Regiment

References

Sources

Qureshi, Maj MI. (1958). The First Punjabis: History of the First Punjab Regiment, 1759-1956. Aldershot: Gale & Polden.

British Indian Army infantry regiments
Military units and formations established in 1776
Military units and formations disestablished in 1922